Podvis may refer to the following places: 
Podvis, Smolyan, Province, Bulgaria
 Podvis, Burgas Province, Bulgaria
 Podvis, Krivogaštani, Macedonia
 Podvis, Kičevo, Macedonia
 Podvis (Knjaževac), Serbia
 Podvis Col, Antarctica